Hasan Adan Samatar (b. May 23, 1953 in Diinsoor, Somalia) is a prominent Somali singer, guitarist and theatrical performer.

Biography
Samatar was born to an artistic family in Dinsoor, Somalia in 1953. He grew up in Baidoa, where he attended primary and elementary schools. He subsequently relocated to Mogadishu, the nation's capital, and began his secondary education.

Samatar's involvement with music began at a very early age, with him first taking up singing during childhood. He later started to play the guitar. While most of Samatar's songs have been in Standard Somali, many of his early tunes were in the Maay variety. His first mainstream song was "Hadaad diido hadalkayga" in 1974.

After graduating from high school, Samatar planned on attending university in Italy. However, at the behest of friends, he decided to first take part in the 1971 edition of Heesaha Hirgalay, a talent competition that was at the time Somalia's equivalent of American Idol. Samatar wound up winning the entire contest. He was shortly afterwards inducted into Waaberi, the premiere Somali musical ensemble, and emerged as a leader in the local music and theater scenes.

Theater
Samatar has acted in more than two dozen plays, ranging from melodramatic and socially conscious pieces to romantic productions. He is noted for both his performing ability and charismatic style.

Music
Among the most influential and enduring of Somali singers, Samatar has a musical corpus of over 200 songs, and has performed several duets with other popular Somali artists, including Saado Cali, Khadija Qalanjo and Seynab Haji Ali.

Samatar credits his exposure to Somali folklore and cultural festivals at a young age with his artistic achievements:

Samatar also encourages Somali parents in the diaspora to teach their children the rich Somali culture, particularly songs and poetry, so that the youth will appreciate the beauty of their traditions and draw pride from that.

Awards
On August 14, 2010, Samatar received a lifetime achievement award from leaders of the Somali community in Minneapolis. A spokesman for Eagle Media, which had put together the tribute dinner and gala party, indicated that the organization had sought to present Samatar the prize years earlier but was waiting for the artist to return to Minnesota.

Personal life
Samatar now spends his time between in Toronto, Ontario, Canada and Amsterdam, Netherlands, and still continues to tour. 
He settled down Djibouti since 2015  and had a new baby with his new wife

Discography
Popular songs by Samatar include:

"Saylo" duet with sahra Axmed
Kala hadhi maynee (Hilbaheenna isku yaalle) or "We Will Not Be Apart" – duet with Seynab Haji Ali "Baxsan". Lyrics by Yusuf Aadan and melody by Ismail Gare. From the play: Garcadaawo iyo caashaq. Abdirahman

See also
Waaberi

Notes

References 

Somalia: Somali Famous legend gets Lifetime Achievement Award

Living people
1953 births
People from Bay, Somalia
20th-century Somalian male singers
21st-century Somalian male singers